

This is a list of the National Register of Historic Places listings in Delaware County, Pennsylvania.

This is intended to be a complete list of the properties and districts on the National Register of Historic Places in Delaware County, Pennsylvania, United States. The locations of National Register properties and districts for which the latitude and longitude coordinates are included below, may be seen in a map.

There are 96 properties and districts listed on the National Register in the county. Seven sites are further designated as National Historic Landmarks.  Another property was once listed but has been removed.

Current listings

|}

Former listing

|}

See also

 List of National Historic Landmarks in Pennsylvania
 National Register of Historic Places listings in Pennsylvania
 Listings in neighboring counties: Philadelphia, Chester, Montgomery, New Castle County, Delaware, 
 List of Pennsylvania state historical markers in Delaware County

References

Delaware County